The first season of The Boulet Brothers' Dragula  premiered on  the Hey Qween Network streaming service on October 31, 2016, and concluded on February 20, 2017. The series featured nine contestants, from all over California, competing for the title of World's First Drag Supermonster and a cash prize of $10,000. Guest judges included director Darren Stein, and drag performers Peaches Christ and Heklina. It ran for seven episodes, including a special episode incorporating unutilized footage. The season was subsequently remastered, and was distributed by OutTv, Amazon Prime, and SBS Viceland.

The winner of first season of The Boulet Brothers' Dragula was Vander Von Odd, with Frankie Doom and Melissa Befierce as the runner-up. Frankie Doom and Loris returned later to compete in The Boulet Brothers' Dragula: Resurrection, a competition between contestants from previous seasons of Dragula, with the winner returning for the fourth season of Dragula.

Contestants

Ages, names, and cities stated are at time of filming.

Contestant progress
Legend:

Exterminations

Guest judges

Episode summary

References

2016 in LGBT history
2016 television seasons
2017 in LGBT history
2017 television seasons
The Boulet Brothers' Dragula